Thomas Bines (died April 9, 1826) was a U.S. Representative from New Jersey from 1814 to 1815.

Biography
Born in Trenton, New Jersey, Bines attended the common schools.
He was appointed coroner for Salem County on October 16, 1802.

Bines was elected sheriff of Salem County in 1808 and served until 1810.

Bines was elected as a Democratic-Republican to the Thirteenth Congress to fill the vacancy caused by the death of United States Representative Jacob Hufty (November 2, 1814 – March 3, 1815).
He was not a candidate for renomination to the Fourteenth Congress in 1814.

Bines was elected Justice of the Peace of Lower Penns Neck Township, New Jersey, in 1822 and served in this capacity until 1826.

He died in Lower Penns Neck Township, Salem County, April 9, 1826.

References

18th-century births
1826 deaths
Democratic-Republican Party members of the United States House of Representatives from New Jersey
Year of birth unknown